David Hale Rollandini (born 6 February 1979) is an American-Italian former professional baseball pitcher. He was born in Springfield, Virginia and attended college at Oklahoma State University. He signed as an amateur free agent with the Philadelphia Phillies in 2001. He played in the Frontier League and Atlantic League in 2002 and 2003, and played in the 2004 Summer Olympics. In 2006, he signed with the Houston Astros and played for the Corpus Christi Hooks, his last season in professional baseball.

External links

1979 births
Living people
Olympic baseball players of Italy
Baseball players at the 2004 Summer Olympics
Canton Crocodiles players
Nashua Pride players
Pennsylvania Road Warriors players
Corpus Christi Hooks players
Oklahoma State Cowboys baseball players
Florida Complex League Phillies players
Grosseto Baseball Club players
Baseball players from Virginia